Pugong (1904 – c. 1960s) was a Manchu prince of the Qing dynasty. He was the son of Zaixun and a cousin of Puyi, the Last Emperor of China. He married Huang Yongni (黃詠霓), an ethnic Hui Beijing opera actress who is better known by her stage name "Xueyanqin" (雪艷琴). Their marriage ended with divorce in 1934. Their son, Huang Shixiang, who adopted his mother's family name "Huang", is also a prominent Beijing opera actor.

References

Qing dynasty imperial princes
1904 births
1960s deaths